The 2013 Ryobi One-Day Cup was the 44th season of the official List A domestic cricket in Australia. It was played in a four-week period at the start of the domestic season to separate its schedule from the Sheffield Shield, held after this tournament's conclusion. It was held exclusively in Sydney and most matches were broadcast live on free-to-air television on GEM.

Points table

Victoria deducted 0.5 of a point for a slow-over rate in the match against Queensland.

Group stage

Finals

References

External links
 Ryobi One-Day Cup 2013 on ESPN Cricinfo
 RYOBI Cup on Cricket Australia

Ryobi One-Day Cup
Australian domestic limited-overs cricket tournament seasons
Ryobi One-Day Cup